Francisco Castro (29 January 1922 in Cayey, Puerto Rico – 14 December 2008 in Orlando, Florida) was a Puerto Rican long jumper and triple jumper who competed in the 1952 Summer Olympics.

References

1922 births
2008 deaths
People from Cayey, Puerto Rico
Puerto Rican male long jumpers
Puerto Rican male triple jumpers
Olympic track and field athletes of Puerto Rico
Athletes (track and field) at the 1952 Summer Olympics
Central American and Caribbean Games gold medalists for Puerto Rico
Competitors at the 1946 Central American and Caribbean Games
Competitors at the 1950 Central American and Caribbean Games
Central American and Caribbean Games medalists in athletics